Fengmingshan Station is a station on Loop line of Chongqing Rail Transit in Chongqing municipality, China. It is located in Shapingba District and opened in 2021.

References

Railway stations in Chongqing
Railway stations in China opened in 2021
Chongqing Rail Transit stations